The Artsruni (also transliterated as Ardzruni) were an ancient noble (princely) family of Armenia.

Background and history
The Artsruni's claimed descent from Sennacherib, King of Assyria (705 BC–681 BC).  Although it mirrors the Bagratuni claim of Davidic descent and the Mamikonian claim of descent from the royal Han Dynasty, it is usually interpreted as a piece of genealogical mythology. The origin of this claim is attributed to Moses of Chorene according to whom Sennacherib's sons fled to Armenia after murdering him and founded the clans of the Artsruni and Gnuni. Chorene in turn was in all likelihood inspired by Biblical tradition:

According to the genealogist and historian Cyril Toumanoff, as well as historian M. Chahin, the Artsruni family were an offshoot of the earlier Orontids, Professor James Russell proposed the idea that the Artsrunis derived their name from the Urartian word artsibini (eagle) which survived in Armenian as artsiv (արծիվ). Other scholars have suggested that this was actually an Armenian word that was loaned into Urartian. The eagle was a totemic animal for the Artsrunis and in a legend the progenitor of the Artsrunis is said to have been abandoned as a child but rescued by an eagle.

The first attested member of the family is thought to be Mithrobarzanes in 69 B.C, the viceroy of Tigranes the Great in Sophene. During the reign of the Arsacid family over Armenia (Arshakuni), the family ruled the princely estates of Greater and Lesser Aghbak in Vaspurakan, southeast of Lake Van, gradually annexing the surrounding territory.

In the middle of the 4th century the family was deposed. Chavash survived, and recovered power. In 369 the state was led by Merujan Artsruni who guided Persian troops to Armenia, exchanged Christianity for Mazdaism, and defeated the General (sparapet) Mamikonian. The latter recovered power soon after, however, and Merujan was killed.

Around 772 the Artsruni presided over the families of Amatuni, Rshtuni, Teruni of Dariunq (before a possession of the Bagratuni) and ruled the regions of Maku, Artaz, Great Zab Valley and Van river. In the same 8th century, the Bagratid dynasty, re-established the monarch of Armenia, and the Artsrunis were "among its most powerful vassals and rivals". When the territory of historical Armenia was, about a century later, succeeded by several subkingdoms (each of whom were rule by "lesser princes"), the area of Vaspurakan came to be ruled in by the Artsrunis, who, in 908, received their investiture from their Abbasid suzerains. Thus, Khatcḥik-Gagik II Artsruni was the first of the Artsrunis to rule Vaspurakan under Abbasid suzerainty.

Gagik I of Vaspurakan claimed the title of "King of Armenia" from the Bagratuni Dynasty until his death in 936 or 943.

In the beginning of the 11th century, the Artsruni settled westwards in Cappadocia, retreating from eastern invaders. In 1021, Seneqerim-Hovhannes of Vaspurakan was given Sebaste, Evdokia, and possibly Amasia as fiefdom from the Byzantine emperor Basil II in return for his entire kingdom. He and 14,000 of his retainers settled in the Theme of Sebasteia, while the Kingdom of Vaspurakan became the Byzantine theme of Vasprakania, which lasted for fifty years until 1071.

Cultural legacy
The Artsrunis were patrons of the arts, which, as the Encyclopedia Iranica states, is evidenced in the "splendid tenth-century monuments of architecture and of fresco and miniature painting especially in the palace and the church of Akdamar". These two constructions were built on the order of Khachik Gagik II. Another example are the "literary productions", such as those by Thomas Artsruni (Tovma Artsruni) in the tenth century (the History of the House of Artsruni).

In popular culture
Umberto Eco introduced the character of Ardsruni, a nobleman and alchemist in Cilicia, in his fantastic novel Baudolino.

References

Sources